Shiaxa (Sjiagha) and Yenimu (Jénimu, Oser), together known as South Awyu, are a Papuan language or languages of Papua, Indonesia. Whether they constitute one language or two depends on one's criteria for a 'language'. The two varieties are,

Bamgi River Awyu (Oser, Yenimu/Jénimu)
Ia River Awyu (Shiaxa/Sjìagha)

References

External links
Shiaxa at the Awyu–Ndumut research group at VU University Amsterdam: 

Languages of western New Guinea
Awyu–Dumut languages